The 2022 Moselle Open was a tennis tournament played on indoor hard courts. It was the 24th edition of the Moselle Open, and part of the ATP Tour 250 Series of the 2022 ATP Tour. It took place at the Arènes de Metz from 19 September to 25 September 2022.

Champions

Singles

  Lorenzo Sonego def.  Alexander Bublik, 7–6(7–3), 6–2

Doubles

  Hugo Nys /  Jan Zieliński def.  Lloyd Glasspool /  Harri Heliövaara, 7–6(7–5), 6–4

Singles main-draw entrants

Seeds

 1 Rankings are as of 12 September 2022

Other entrants
The following players received wildcards into the singles main draw:
  Richard Gasquet 
  Ugo Humbert
  Gilles Simon

The following player was accepted directly into the main draw using a protected ranking:
  Dominic Thiem

The following players received entry from the qualifying draw:
  Grégoire Barrère
  Zizou Bergs
  Evan Furness
  Stan Wawrinka

Withdrawals
  Pablo Carreño Busta → replaced by  Lorenzo Sonego
  Maxime Cressy → replaced by  João Sousa
  Alejandro Davidovich Fokina → replaced by  Jiří Lehečka
  Grigor Dimitrov → replaced by  Arthur Rinderknech
  Ilya Ivashka → replaced by  Mikael Ymer
  Karen Khachanov → replaced by  Adrian Mannarino
  Filip Krajinović → replaced by  David Goffin
  Gaël Monfils → replaced by  Hugo Gaston

Doubles main-draw entrants

Seeds

 Rankings are as of 12 September 2022

Other entrants
The following pairs received wildcards into the doubles main draw:
  Dan Added /  Albano Olivetti
  Grégoire Barrère /  Quentin Halys

Withdrawals
  Simone Bolelli /  Fabio Fognini → replaced by  Sander Gillé /  Joran Vliegen

References

External links
Official website

2022 ATP Tour
2022 in French tennis
September 2022 sports events in France